Mike Amiri (born ) is an American fashion designer. He is the founder, CEO and creative director of AMIRI.

Early life and education

Mike Amiri is born and grew up in Hollywood, Los Angeles.

Career
Amiri began his career handcrafting stage pieces for musicians. He designed a capsule collection for the LA concept store, Maxfield, influenced by his rock & roll aesthetic.

In 2014, Amiri launched his fashion line, AMIRI.

AMIRI

Since 2018, Amiri has been a member of the CFDA, when he was nominated for the Swarovski Award for Emerging Talent at the CFDA Fashion Awards.

In 2019, Renzo Rosso's, OTB Group acquired a minority stake in AMIRI. In 2020, Amiri opened his flagship store on Rodeo Drive, Beverly Hills.

Amiri  presents a collection bi-annually at Paris Fashion Week.

In  2022 the brand opened a store in The Dubai Mall  with local retail partner Soho Middle East.

References

Living people
People from Los Angeles
American fashion designers
American people of Iranian descent
1976 births